"Cuddle Up, Cozy Down Christmas"  is a song by American singer-songwriter Dolly Parton and Canadian-Italian singer Michael Bublé. The song was released as a digital download on October 2, 2020 as the fourth single from Parton's forty-seventh solo studio album A Holly Dolly Christmas. The song was written by Dolly Parton and produced by Kent Wells.

Background

Music video
A music video to accompany the release of "Cuddle Up, Cozy Down Christmas" was first released onto YouTube on November 7, 2020. The video was directed by Alex Popkin. The animated video shows the two singers performing the song together, Parton wears a Santa outfit with holly in her hair and Bublé  sits at a piano.

Personnel
Credits adapted from Tidal.
 Kent Wells – producer, guitar, percussion, voice over
 Andrew Mayer – assistant engineer
 Roy Agee – bass trombone, orchestration, tenor trombone
 Paul Nelson – cello
 Sarighani Reist – cello
 Sam Levine – clarinet, flute, orchestration, saxophone
 Steve Turner – drums, percussion
 Tyler Spratt – editor
 Ryan Enockson – engineer
 Dolly Parton – lead vocals, writer
 Michael Bublé – lead vocals
 David Davidson – orchestral arranger, violin
 Taylor Pollert – orchestral engineer
 Paul Hollowell – piano
 Kevin Willis – tracking engineer
 Dennis Crouch – upright bass
 Chris Farrell – viola
 Monisa Angell – viola
 David Angell – violin
 Janet Darnall – violin
 Karen Winkelmann – violin
 Mary Kathryn Vanosdale – violin
 Stefan Petrescu – violin
 Wei Tsung Chang – violin
 Chris Latham – voice editor

Charts

References

2020 songs
2020 singles
Dolly Parton songs
Michael Bublé songs